The following lists events that happened during 1948 in the Democratic People's Republic of Korea.

Incumbents
Premier: Kim Il-sung (starting 9 September)
Supreme Leader: Kim Il-sung (starting 9 September)

Events
 Establishment of North Korea(DPRK).
2nd Congress of the Workers' Party of North Korea

August
 August 25 - 1948 North Korean parliamentary election

See also
Years in Japan
Years in South Korea

References

 
North Korea
1940s in North Korea
Years of the 20th century in North Korea
North Korea
North